The Grenland Terminal, also known as the Brevik Terminal, is a combined rail freight terminal and port located at Heistad just north of Brevik in Porsgrunn, Norway. Owned by Grenland Harbour, it is connected to the national railway network by a spur of the Brevik Line, which was connected in 1993.

References

Ports and harbours of Norway
Brevik Line
Porsgrunn